Claus Mørch may refer to:

 Claus Mørch, Sr. (1912–2004), Norwegian Olympic fencer
 Claus Mørch, Jr. (born 1947), Norwegian Olympic fencer and son of the above
 Claus Mørch (born 1976), Norwegian fencer and descendant of Ole Clausen Mørch